Slowe may be the name of:

Alistair Slowe (born 1988), English football player
Christopher Slowe (born 1978), American businessman and internet personality
Georgia Slowe (born 1966), English actress 
Lucy Diggs Slowe (1885-1937), American educator and athlete
Vikki Slowe (born 1947), British printmaker and painter

See also
Slow (disambiguation)
Slough (disambiguation)